The 2018 Rugby Europe Women's Sevens Trophy is the second division of the 2018 Rugby Europe Women's Sevens. This edition was hosted by the cities of Dnipro and Szeged from 23 June to 1 July, with the two highest-placed teams promoted to the 2019 Grand Prix and the two teams with the fewest points relegated to the 2019 Conference.

Schedule

Standings

Dnipro

The event was held between 23–24 June 2018.

Pool stage

Pool A

Pool B

Pool C

Knockout stage

Challenge Trophy

5th place

Cup

Szeged

The event was held between 7–8 July 2018.

Pool stage

Pool A

Pool B

Pool C

Knockout stage

Challenge Trophy

5th place

Cup

External links
 Tournament page

References

Trophy
2018
2018
rugby union
Europe
2018
Sport in Dnipro
Sport in Szeged